Edward J. Resch is the Executive Vice President and CFO of State Street Corporation. He was previously the CFO of Pershing, a Credit Suisse First Boston subsidiary, CFO of Donaldson, Lufkin & Jenrette, Inc. and CFO of  their Capital Markets Group.  He is a current member of the Committee on Capital Markets Regulation.

Resch has a BS in industrial engineering from Lehigh University and an MBA from Rutgers University.

References

Year of birth missing (living people)
Living people
Lehigh University alumni
Rutgers University alumni